Lee Min-ki (born January 16, 1985) is a South Korean actor, singer and model. Lee played his first TV leading role in the 2005 sports drama Taereung National Village, followed by the television series Love Truly (2006), Dal-ja's Spring (2007),  Because This Is My First Life (2017), The Beauty Inside (2018), and My Liberation Notes (2022). He has also starred in feature films, most notably in the box office hits Tidal Wave (2009), Quick (2011) and Very Ordinary Couple (2013).

Career

Acting
After honing his acting in one-act dramas, Lee Min-ki first gained popularity on television in romantic comedies Love Truly (2006) and Dal-ja's Spring (2007). He then starred in the quirky low-rated cult series Evasive Inquiry Agency (2007) and alternated mainstream films with indies such as Oishii Man (2009). He gained favorable notices for his supporting roles in the thriller A Million as a hot-tempered Marine-turned-janitor who finds himself involved in a survival reality show; and the disaster film Tidal Wave, in which he plays a lifeguard who makes a heartbreaking sacrifice when a fictional tsunami hits the Korean beach town of Haeundae.
Lee then solidified his bona fide movie star status with his leading roles in the action film Quick and romantic comedy Spellbound.

Lee starred alongside Kim Min-hee in the relationship drama Very Ordinary Couple (2013), which was a hit at the box office and received rave reviews. 
He followed with leading roles in thriller Monster (2014), action noir For the Emperor (2014) and drama film Shoot Me in the Heart (2015), based on the bestselling novel of the same name by Jeong Yu-jeong.

In 2017, Lee was cast in the romantic-comedy drama Because This Is My First Life opposite Jung So-min; this is Lee's first television leading role in 10 years. This was followed  with the fantasy melodrama The Beauty Inside (2018), based on the 2015 romantic comedy film of the same name. He played a man who suffers from Prosopagnosia.

In 2019, Lee returned to the small screen with the crime detective drama The Lies Within playing a role of a detective opposite Lee Yoo-young. On January 13, 2020, it was announced that Lee would star in the occult thriller film Three Days alongside Park Shin-yang and Lee Re.

In 2021, Lee starred alongside Nana in the MBC romantic comedy Oh My Ladylord. After his contract with the former agency expired in September 2021, Lee signd a contract with Yeongsang ENT. The same year, he joined the JTBC television series My Liberation Notes which premiered in April 2022. He played the role of Yeom Chang-hee, the second of three siblings with no proper goal in life.

Singing
After performing a stylized version of "My Way" at the 2008 Mnet KM Music Festival, Lee lent his vocals to a track with Korean electronica/pop singer Sheean in a collaboration with Japanese electronica/Shibuya-kei artist FreeTEMPO. The song, titled "Power of Love," was released as a digital single, and Lee also appeared in the music video. 
On August 11, 2009, he unveiled his musical debut No Kidding, a six track EP with a very indie-electro rock sound.  The album's title song "Eternal Summer" was the first and only single released. 
In 2013, he released two singles titled "Those Days I Had with You" and "Everything" in collaboration with Gold Coast.

Personal life
Lee enlisted for his mandatory military service on August 7, 2014, and was assigned as a public service worker. He was discharged in August 2016.

Filmography

Film

Television series

Web series

Music video appearances

Discography

Albums

Soundtrack

Awards and nominations

References

External links 
  
 
 
 

South Korean male film actors
South Korean male television actors
Konkuk University alumni
1985 births
Living people
People from Gimhae
Best New Actor Paeksang Arts Award (film) winners